Lyudmila Korolik (born 15 November 1975) is a Belarusian cross-country skier. She competed at the 1998 Winter Olympics and the 2006 Winter Olympics.

References

External links
 

1975 births
Living people
Belarusian female cross-country skiers
Olympic cross-country skiers of Belarus
Cross-country skiers at the 1998 Winter Olympics
Cross-country skiers at the 2006 Winter Olympics
Sportspeople from Minsk